Rosenberg Library, a public library located at 2310 Sealy Street in Galveston, Texas, United States, is the oldest continuously operating library in Texas.  It serves as headquarters of the Galveston County Library System and its librarian also functions as the Galveston County Librarian.

History
The library was established in 1900, and the building constructed a few years later. In 1905 it absorbed the collection of the defunct Public Library (est. in 1871 as the Galveston Free Library).

Segregation

Like many institutions in the American South, during segregation the library maintained a separate branch for African Americans.  This new library, built in 1905, was added to the western wing of Central High School, the city's high school for African Americans.

Galveston & Texas History Center
The Galveston and Texas History Center collects materials relating to Galveston and early Texas. Major manuscript collections include the papers of Samuel May Williams, Gail Borden, John Grant Tod, Jr., and James Morgan; the records of several 19th and early 20th century businesses, including those of I.H. Kempner, Harris Kempner, Henry M. Trueheart, and J. C. League; the records of several organizations and churches in the area; and 20th-century collections reflecting recent events and activities in Galveston and the upper Gulf Coast. The map collection includes maps and charts of Texas, the Gulf of Mexico, the Caribbean Sea, and adjacent coasts dating from the 16th century to the present. Holdings of the museum department include historical artifacts pertaining to Galveston or early Texas, paintings of Galveston subjects or by such local artists as Julius Stockflethqv and Boyer Gonzalez, and a sizable collection of Russian and Greek icons. The rare book collection contains incunabula, first editions, and examples of fine printing.

See also

National Register of Historic Places listings in Galveston County, Texas
Education in Galveston, Texas
History of the Jews in Galveston, Texas

References

Bibliography
 
  1910-

External links

Rosenberg Library, History Center & Museum
Galveston & Texas History Center

Public libraries in Texas
Landmarks in Texas
Culture of Galveston, Texas
Buildings and structures in Galveston, Texas
National Register of Historic Places in Galveston County, Texas
Education in Galveston, Texas
Libraries established in 1904
Library buildings completed in 1905
Libraries on the National Register of Historic Places in Texas
1904 establishments in Texas
Libraries participating in TexShare